Peter Fishman (born in Kyiv in1955) is a Russian sculptor and painter of Jewish ancestry, Professor ordinarius in sculpture at the Smolensk University for Humanities.

Life and career
Peter Fishman was born into a family of a serviceman in 1955. The family moved from city to city due to father’s army service. In 1967 they settled in the city of Smolensk. There Fishman started painting in the art studio of the local Palace of Pioneers; some years later he entered the Smolensk art school. After finishing the art school, he continued his education in the field of fine arts at the department of arts of the Smolensk State Pedagogical Institute. In 1978 he successfully defended his final project for a master's degree and earned praise of the state commission. His supervisor was people's artist Albert Sergeev.

From 1980 to 1986 Fishman worked as a fine art restorer at the Smolensk State Museum. Currently, in addition to creative and educational activities he is engaged in restoration of historic and artistic monuments. Since 1978 he has been participating regularly in all-Union and all-Russian exhibitions. In 1989 Fishman became a member of the Union of Artists. In 1998 and 2000 he organized the stone sculpture symposiums in Smolensk. In 2005 he was the artistic director of the creative team for the cultural exchange between the twin cities of Smolensk and Hagen, Germany.

Awards
2005 — state grant of the Union of Artists of Russia in the field of Fine Arts 
2004 — diploma of the Russian Academy of Arts
1999 — diploma of the Union of Artists of Russia

Selected exhibitions
2013 — "The Artists of Smolensk for the city", Smolensk 
2011 — "The Artists of Smolensk", Ivanovo 
2010 — "The Artists of Smolensk" (Exhibition Hall of the Union of Russian Artists), Moscow
2009
Second All-Russian Exhibition of Sculpture, honoring the great sculptor Stepan Erzia, Saransk
All-Russian Exhibition "Russia XI», Central House of Artists, Moscow 
Exhibition of Smolensk artists "Following the old Smolensk road," (State Exhibition Hall - 	Museum " Nasledie"), Moscow 
2008 — Tenth Regional Exhibition "Artists of the central regions of Russia", Yaroslavl
2006 — First All-Russian Exhibition of Sculpture, Lipetsk
2005 — Stone International Sculpture Symposium in Hagen, Germany 
2004 — Tenth All-Russian Exhibition "Russia" (Central Exhibition Hall), Moscow
2003 — Ninth Regional Exhibition "Artists of the central regions of Russia", Lipetsk
2002 — Interregional Exhibition "Young Russia", Bryansk
2001
Exhibition honoring the 75th Anniversary of the People's Artist of Russia, Professor Albert Sergeyev
 A traveling exhibition of the Russian Academy of Arts, Smolensk, Moscow
Exhibition of Smolensk Artists, Vitebsk, Belarus
Exhibition of Smolensk Artists, Orsha, Belarus
2000
All-Russian Art Exhibition honoring 2000 years of Christianity, "For Thy Name's Sake"
All-Russian Art Exhibition "Dedicated to the Defenders of the Fatherland" honoring the 55th 	Anniversary of the Victory in the Great Patriotic War, Moscow
1999 — Ninth All-Russian Exhibition "Russia, Moscow

1998
Regional Exhibition "Time. Space. The Man", Gagarin
Group Art Exhibition "The teacher and the students", Gagarin
Exhibition of Smolensk Artists at the Military Academy of Air Defense, Smolensk
1997 — Eighth Regional Exhibition "Artists of the central regions of Russia", Moscow
1994 — Solo exhibition, Konenkov Museum of Sculpture, Smolensk
1991 — Inter-republican exhibition "Monuments of the Fatherland in the works of Russian artists, Ukraine, Belarus", Smolensk, Minsk
1990 — Seventh Regional Art Exhibition "Artists of the central regions of Russia", Vladimir
1988 — All-Union Art Exhibition "Guarding the gains of socialism", Moscow
1987 — Republican Art Exhibition "The Artist and the Time", Moscow
1985
Second All-Russian Exhibition of Sculpture, Moscow
Sixth Zonal Art Exhibition "Artists of Nechernozemie"
Seventh Republican Art Exhibition "Soviet Russia", Moscow
1980 — Regional Exhibition of the Artists' Union, Smolensk
1979 — Regional Exhibition of the Artists' Union, Smolensk
1978 — All-Union Exhibition of Young Artists, Moscow

Publication
Гайдарова, Раиса Петровна. Художник - человек мира: публикации разных лет, - Смоленск : Смоленская гор. тип., 2011, с.128 
Смоленские художники «60 лет смоленской организации Союза Художников России», Смоленск 1999г, Биографическая справка с.69

Monumental sculptures
2015 — Governor Aleksandr Lopatin, Bronze. Smolensk, Russia 
2014 — Memorial Board of Russian writer Boris Vasilyev, Bronze. Smolensk, Russia
2013 — Memorial Board of Soviet General Ivan Chernyakhovsky, Bronze. Smolensk, Russia
2011 — Bust of Major General Evgeni Olenin, Bronze. Smolensk, Russia
2010 — Bust of Vice-admiral Stepan Makarov, Bronze. Smolensk, Russia
2008 — Bust of Major General Konstantin Rakutin, Bronze. Yelnya, Russia
2005
Wish fulfilling fish, Granite. Hagen, Germany
Phoenix, Granite. Hagen, Germany
 Bust of Aleksandr Oleynik, Bronze. Smolensk, Russia
2004 — Bust of Lieutenant General Nicolay Gagen, Bronze. Yelnya, Russia
2002 — Bust of Major General Vasiliy Sosedov, Bronze. Smolensk, Russia 
2001 — Nude, Granite. Hagen, Germany
2000 — Unique fish, Granite. Smolensk, Russia 
1998 — Sculptor's muse, Granite. Smolensk, Russia

Photo gallery

External links

http://www.freundeskreis-hagen-smolensk.de/de/?p=1121

1955 births
Living people
Artists from Kyiv
Ukrainian Jews
Russian people of Ukrainian-Jewish descent
Modern painters
Modern sculptors
Russian male sculptors
Jewish sculptors
Soviet sculptors
Full Members of the USSR Academy of Arts
Russian contemporary artists
Russian painters
Russian male painters
Smolensk State University